Envisat ("Environmental Satellite") is a large inactive Earth-observing satellite which is still in orbit and now considered space debris. Operated by the European Space Agency (ESA), it was the world's largest civilian Earth observation satellite.

It was launched on 1 March 2002 aboard an Ariane 5 from the Guyana Space Centre in Kourou, French Guiana, into a Sun synchronous polar orbit at an altitude of 790 ± 10 km. It orbits the Earth in about 101 minutes, with a repeat cycle of 35 days. After losing contact with the satellite on 8 April 2012, ESA formally announced the end of Envisat's mission on 9 May 2012.

Envisat cost 2.3 billion Euro (including 300 million Euro for 5 years of operations) to develop and launch. The mission has been replaced by the Sentinel series of satellites. The first of these, Sentinel 1, has taken over the radar duties of Envisat since its launch in 2014.

Mission 
Envisat was launched as an Earth observation satellite. Its objective was to service the continuity of European Remote-Sensing Satellite missions, providing additional observational parameters to improve environmental studies.

In working towards the global and regional objectives of the mission, numerous scientific disciplines currently use the data acquired from the different sensors on the satellite to study such things as atmospheric chemistry, ozone depletion, biological oceanography, ocean temperature and colour, wind waves, hydrology (humidity, floods), agriculture and arboriculture, natural hazards, digital elevation modelling (using interferometry), monitoring of maritime traffic, atmospheric dispersion modelling (pollution), cartography and study of snow and ice.

Specifications
Dimensions
 ×  ×  in orbit with the solar array deployed.

Mass
, including  of fuel and a  instrument payload.
Power
Solar array with a total load of 3560 W.

Instruments 

Envisat carries an array of nine Earth-observation instruments that gathered information about the Earth (land, water, ice, and atmosphere) using a variety of measurement principles. A tenth instrument, DORIS, provided guidance and control. Several of the instruments were advanced versions of instruments that were flown on the earlier ERS-1 and ERS 2 missions and other satellites.

MWR 
MWR (Microwave Radiometer) was designed for measuring water vapour in the atmosphere.

AATSR 

AATSR (Advanced Along Track Scanning Radiometer) can measure the sea surface temperature in the visible and infrared spectra. It is the successor of ATSR1 and ATSR2, payloads of ERS 1 and ERS 2. Among the secondary objectives of AATSR is the observation of environmental parameters such as water content, biomass, and vegetal health and growth.

MIPAS 
MIPAS (Michelson Interferometer for Passive Atmospheric Sounding) is a Fourier transforming infrared spectrometer which provides pressure and temperature profiles, and profiles of trace gases nitrogen dioxide, nitrous oxide, methane, nitric acid, ozone, and water in the stratosphere. The instrument functions with high spectral resolution in an extended spectral band, which allows coverage across the Earth in all seasons and at equal quality night and day. MIPAS has a vertical resolution of  depending on altitude (the larger at the level of the upper stratosphere).

MERIS 

MERIS (MEdium Resolution Imaging Spectrometer) measures the reflectance of the Earth (surface and atmosphere) in the solar spectral range (390 to 1040 nm) and transmits 15 spectral bands back to the ground segment. MERIS was built at the Cannes Mandelieu Space Center.

SCIAMACHY 

SCIAMACHY (SCanning Imaging Absorption spectroMeter for Atmospheric CHartographY) compares light coming from the sun to light reflected by the Earth, which provides information on the atmosphere through which the Earth-reflected light has passed.

SCIAMACHY is an image spectrometer with the principal objective of mapping the concentration of trace gases and aerosols in the troposphere and stratosphere. Rays of sunlight that are reflected transmitted, backscattered and reflected by the atmosphere are captured at a high spectral resolution (0.2 to 0.5 nm) for wavelengths between 240 and 1700 nm, and in certain spectra between 2,000 and 2,400 nm. Its high spectral resolution over a wide range of wavelengths can detect many trace gases even in tiny concentrations. The wavelengths captured also allow effective detection of aerosols and clouds.
SCIAMACHY uses 3 different targeting modes: to the nadir (against the sun), to the limbus (through the atmospheric corona), and during solar or lunar eclipses. SCIAMACHY was built by Netherlands and Germany at TNO/TPD, SRON and Airbus Defence and Space Netherlands.

RA-2 
RA-2 (Radar Altimeter 2) is a dual-frequency Nadir pointing Radar operating in the Ku band and S bands, it is used to define ocean topography, map/monitor sea ice and measure land heights.

Mean sea level measurements from Envisat are continuously graphed at the Centre National d'Etudes Spatiales web site, on the Aviso page.

ASAR 
ASAR (Advanced Synthetic Aperture Radar) operates in the C band in a wide variety of modes. It can detect changes in surface heights with sub-millimeter precision. It served as a data link for ERS 1 and ERS 2, providing numerous functions such as observations of different polarities of light or combining different polarities, angles of incidence and spatial resolutions.

These different types of raw data can be given several levels of treatment (suffixed to the ID of the acquisition mode: IMP, APS, and so on):
 RAW (raw data, or "Level 0"), which contains all the information necessary to create images.
 S (complex data, "Single Look Complex"), images in complex numeric form, the real and imaginary parts of the output of the compression algorithm
 P (precision image), amplified image with constant pixel width (12.5 m for IMP)
 M (medium precision image), amplified radiometry image with a resolution greater than P
 G (geocoded image), amplified image to which simple geographical transforms have been applied to show relief.

Data capture in WV mode is unusual in that they constitute a series of 5 km × 5 km spaced at 100 km.

DORIS 

DORIS (Doppler Orbitography and Radiopositioning Integrated by Satellite) determines the satellite's orbit to within .

GOMOS 

GOMOS (Global Ozone Monitoring by Occultation of Stars) looks at stars as they descend through the Earth's atmosphere and change color, allowing measurement of gases such as ozone, including their vertical distribution.

GOMOS uses the principle of occultation. Its sensors detect light from a star traversing the Earth's atmosphere and measures the depletion of that light by trace gases nitrogen dioxide, nitrogen trioxide,), ozone and aerosols present between about  altitude.

Loss of contact 
ESA announced on 12 April 2012 that they lost contact with Envisat on Sunday, 8 April 2012, after 10 years of service, exceeding the initially planned life span by 5 years.  The spacecraft was still in a stable orbit, but attempts to contact it were unsuccessful. Ground-based radar and the French Pleiades Earth probe were used to image the silent Envisat and look for damage. ESA formally announced the end of Envisat's mission on 9 May 2012.

Envisat was launched in 2002 and it operated five years beyond its planned mission lifetime, delivering over a petabyte of data. ESA was expecting to turn off the spacecraft in 2014.

Space safety 

Envisat poses a hazard because of the risk of collisions with space debris. Given its orbit and its area-to-mass ratio, it will take about 150 years for the satellite to be gradually pulled into the Earth's atmosphere. A collision between a satellite the size of Envisat and an object as small as 10 kg could produce a very large cloud of debris, initiating a self-sustaining chain-reaction of collisions and fragmentation with production of new debris, a phenomenon known as the Kessler Syndrome.

Envisat was a candidate for a mission to remove it from orbit, called e.Deorbit. The spacecraft sent to bring down Envisat would itself need to have a mass of approximately 1.6 tonnes.

See also

List of heaviest spacecraft
List of large reentering space debris

References

External links
 Envisat homepage at ESA
 Envisat operations page at ESA
 Miravi – Meris Image Rapid Visualization. MIRAVI shows the gallery of images generated on the Level0 (raw data) Meris Full Resolution (300m) products, few seconds after their availability.
 SRRS – Satellite Rapid Response System. Like MIRAVI but including also ASAR, MERIS Full and Reduced Resolution and ALOS AVNIR2 images.
 Earth Snapshot – Web Portal dedicated to Earth Observation. Includes commented satellite images, information on storms, hurricanes, fires and meteorological phenomena.
 ESA SNAP Toolbox for viewing, calibrating and analyzing Envisat ASAR Level 1 data and higher
 Four years on, Envisat hailed for its contribution to Earth science Physorg.com (2006-02-28)
 ESA Envisat DDS (Data Dissemination System)
 gcs Global Communication & Services – Manufacturer of the Envisat DDS Commercial Receiver Kit for ENVIHAM Home Users
 Dossier Envisat: 10 years of climate and environmental research at Astrium
 Envisat article on eoPortal by ESA

Earth observation satellites of the European Space Agency
Derelict satellites orbiting Earth
Space synthetic aperture radar
Spacecraft launched in 2002
Spacecraft launched by Ariane rockets
Earth satellite radar altimeters
Satellites in low Earth orbit